Grimontia hollisae is a species of Grimontia proteobacteria (family Vibrionaceae), and is the only pathogenic species that does not grow on thiosulfate-citrate-bile salts-sucrose agar (TCBS).  Based on phylogenetic evidence, the species was reclassified in 2003 from Vibrio hollisae.

References

External links	
Type strain of Grimontia hollisae at BacDive -  the Bacterial Diversity Metadatabase

Vibrionales
Bacteria described in 1982